Brother Lucifer is the fourth album by the American stoner/doom metal band Serpent Throne.

Track listing
  "Foxtrot Tango Whiskey"
  "Enough Rope to Hang Yourself"
  "Devil's Breath"
  "Brother Lucifer"
  "Widowmaker"
  "As the Crow Flies"
  "FUBAR"
  "Napalm Mourning"

2013 albums
Serpent Throne albums